Afro Celt Sound System are a British musical group who fuse electronic music with traditional Gaelic and West African music. Afro Celt Sound System were formed in 1995 by producer-guitarist Simon Emmerson, and feature a wide range of guest artists. In 2003, they temporarily changed their name to Afrocelts before reverting to their original name.

Their albums have been released through Peter Gabriel's Real World Records, and they have frequently performed at WOMAD festivals worldwide. Their sales on the label are exceeded only by Gabriel himself. Their recording contract with Real World was for five albums, of which Volume 5: Anatomic was the last.

After a number of festival dates in 2007, the band went on hiatus. In 2010, they regrouped to play a number of shows (including a return to WOMAD), releasing a re-mastered retrospective titled Capture.

On 20 May 2014, Afro Celt Sound System announced the release of the album Born. In January 2016, a posting to that website revealed that due to a dispute with Emmerson, who announced his departure from the band in 2015, there were two active versions of the band, a version led by Emmerson and a separate line-up headed by James McNally and Martin Russell. Emmerson's version of the band released the album The Source in 2016. The dispute ended on 21 December 2016, with an announcement on social media.

The band released their eighth studio album, Flight, on 23 November 2018.

Formation
The inspiration behind the project dates back to 1991, when Simon Emmerson, a Grammy Award-nominated British producer and guitarist, collaborated with Afro-pop star Baaba Maal. While making an album with Maal in Senegal, Emmerson was struck by the similarity between one African melody and a traditional Irish air. Back in London, Irish musician Davy Spillane told Emmerson about a belief that nomadic Celts lived in Africa or India before they migrated to Western Europe. Whether or not the theory was true, Emmerson was intrigued by the two regions' musical affinities.

In an experiment that would prove successful, Emmerson brought two members of Baaba Maal's band together with traditional Irish musicians to see what kind of music the two groups would create. Adding a dash of modern sound, Emmerson also brought in English dance mixers for an electronic beat. "People thought I was mad when I touted the idea," Emmerson told Jim Carroll of The Irish Times. "At the time, I was out of favour with the London club scene. I was broke and on income support but the success was extraordinary".

Career
Jamming in the studios at Real World, musician Peter Gabriel's recording facilities in Wiltshire, England, the group of musicians recorded the basis of their first album in one week. This album, Volume 1: Sound Magic, was released by Real World Records in 1996, and marked the debut of the Afro Celt Sound System.

"Prior to that first album being made, none of us knew if it would work," musician James McNally told Larry Katz of the Boston Herald. "We were strangers who didn't even speak the same language. But we were bowled over by this communication that took place beyond language." McNally, who grew up second-generation Irish in London, played whistles, keyboards, piano, bodhran, and bamboo flute.

Sound Magic has now sold over 300,000 copies. The band performed at festivals, raves, and dance clubs and regularly included two African musicians, Moussa Sissokho on talking drum and djembe and N'Faly Kouyate on vocals, kora and balafon.

Just as the second album was getting off the ground, one of the group's core musicians, 27-year-old keyboardist Jo Bruce, (son of Cream bass player Jack Bruce), died suddenly of an asthma attack. The band was devastated, and the album was put on hold. Sinéad O'Connor then collaborated with the band and helped them cope with their loss. "[O'Connor] blew into the studio on a windy November night and blew away again leaving us something incredibly emotional and powerful," McNally told Katz. "We had this track we didn't know what to do with. Sinéad scribbled a few lyrics and bang! She left us completely choked up." The band used the name of O'Connor's song, "Release", for the title of their album. Volume 2: Release was released in 1999, and by the spring of 2000 it had sold more than half a million copies worldwide. Release is also used as one of the GCSE music set works in the UK that students are required to study for their exam.

In 2000, the group was nominated for a Grammy Award in the Best World Music category. The band, composed at the time of eight members from six countries (the UK, Senegal, Guinea, Ireland, France and Kenya), took pride in its ability to bring people together through music. "We can communicate anywhere at any corner of the planet and feel that we're at home," McNally told Patrick MacDonald of The Seattle Times. "We're breaking down categories of world music and rock music and black music. We leave a door open to communicate with each other's traditions. And it's changed our lives".

In 2001, the group released Volume 3: Further in Time, which climbed to number one on Billboards Top World Music Albums chart. Featuring guest spots by Peter Gabriel and Robert Plant, the album also incorporated a heightened African sound. "On the first two records, the pendulum swung more toward the Celtic, London club side of the equation," Emmerson told The Irish Times Carroll. "For this one, we wanted to have more African vocals and input than we'd done before." Again the Afro Celt Sound System met with success. Chuck Taylor of Billboard praised the album as "a cultural phenomenon that bursts past the traditional boundaries of contemporary music." The single "When You're Falling", with vocals by Gabriel, became a radio hit in the United States.

In 2003, for the Seed album, they changed their name to Afrocelts. They reverted to the longer band name for their subsequent albums, Pod, a compilation of new mixes of songs from the first four albums, Volume 5: Anatomic (their fifth studio album), and Capture (1995–2010).

They played a number of shows to promote Volume 5: Anatomic in 2006 and summer 2007, ending with a gig in Korea, before taking an extended break to work on side projects, amongst them The Imagined Village featuring Simon Emmerson and Johnny Kalsi. Starting in the summer of 2010, the band performed a series of live shows to promote Capture (1995–2010), released on 6 September 2010 on Real World Records. Further performances continue to the present day, and a new album-in-progress titled Born was announced on their website in 2014. Following the split (see below), Emmerson's version of the band released the album The Source in 2016.

Split 
During 2015, the band had split into two formations, one of them including Simon Emmerson, N'Faly Kouyate and Johnny Kalsi, the other one James McNally and Martin Russell. The split was announced on the band's website in January 2016. The dispute officially ended with an announcement on social media on 21 December 2016.

Members
When Afro Celt Sound System formed in the mid-1990s during the Real World Recording Week, the difference between a guest artist and a band member was virtually non-existent. However, over time, a combination of people became most often associated with the name Afro Celt Sound System (while Volume 5: Anatomic only lists Emmerson, McNally, Ó Lionáird and Russell as regulars). The divided grouping of the band into two versions, both operating under the name Afro Celt Sound System, began in January 2016 and was resolved in December 2016 after McNally and Russell agreed to work under a different name from Emmerson.
 
Simon Emmerson
N'Faly Kouyate
Johnny Kalsi
Moussa Sissokho
Griogair Labhruidh
Ronan Browne
Emer Mayock
Davy Spillane

Russell/McNally version
Martin Russell
James McNally
Ian Markin
Tim Bradshaw
Babara Bangoura
Dorothee Munyaneza
Kadially Kouyaté
Dav Daheley

Other musicians who have performed or recorded with Afro Celt Sound System include: Jimmy Mahon, Demba Barry, Babara Bangoura, Iarla Ó Lionáird, Peter Gabriel, Robert Plant, Pete Lockett, Sinéad O'Connor, Pina Kollar, Dorothee Munyaneza, Sevara Nazarkhan, Simon Massey, Jesse Cook, Martin Hayes, Eileen Ivers, Mundy, Mairéad Ní Mhaonaigh and Ciarán Tourish of Altan, Ronan Browne, Michael McGoldrick, Myrdhin, Shooglenifty, Mairead Nesbitt, Nigel Eaton, Davy Spillane, Jonas Bruce, Heather Nova, Julie Murphy and Ayub Ogada, Caroline Lavelle, Ross Ainslie.

Discography

Studio albums

Other albums
 Pod (remix album) (2004)
 Capture (1995–2010) (2010) (compilation) No. 14 NZ

They also recorded the soundtrack for the PC game Magic and Mayhem, released in 1998.

Charted singles

References

External links

 
 Real World Records page

Celtic fusion groups
Worldbeat groups
Real World Records artists
British world music groups
Musical groups established in 1995